Vilca District is one of nineteen districts of the Huancavelica Province in Peru.

Geography 
Other mountains are listed below:

See also 
 Llaqta Qulluy

References